Aellenella is a genus of mites in the family Acaridae.

Species
 Aellenella strinatii S. Mahunka, 1978

References

Acaridae